The Dome Rock Mountains are a mountain range in southern La Paz County, Arizona. The range borders the Colorado River on the west and the Colorado River Indian Reservation on the northwest located in the Lower Colorado River Valley. Quartzsite, Arizona lies on the eastern foothills of the range.

The Dome Rock Mountains are on the southwest of the regional Maria fold and thrust belt.

Range summary 

The Palo Verde Valley borders the range on the west, adjacent to the Colorado River. Interstate 10 bisects the range connecting Ehrenberg on the Colorado River with Quartzsite to the east of the mountains. Quartzsite lies on the western edge of the La Posa Plain which drains the western Kofa National Wildlife Refuge. The Tyson Wash drainage flows north at the western perimeter of the La Posa Plain and turns westwards at the north end of the Dome Rock Mountains to meet the Colorado River region.

Numerous mines and dry washes are located in the range. The western mountain washes drain to the Colorado River, and the eastern washes drain into the La Posa Plain and the north-flowing Tyson Wash.

Dome Rock Mountains access 
The northern portion of the mountains can be accessed from the west via Arizona State Route 95; from the east through the Colorado River Indian Reservation, and I 10.

Quartzsite is in the east center of the range and provides numerous access points. Ehrenberg to the west provides access to areas of the western mountain flank.

Graves found
Miners' graves and a cabin have been found near the Yellow Dog Mine.

See also 
 List of mountain ranges of La Paz County, Arizona
 List of LCRV Wilderness Areas (Colorado River)
 Kofa National Wildlife Refuge

References

External links 
 La Paz placer deposits, western base of Dome Rock Mountains
 Database for Blythe Quadrangle and references to Dome Rock Mountains

Mountain ranges of the Sonoran Desert
Mountain ranges of the Lower Colorado River Valley
Mountain ranges of La Paz County, Arizona
Mountain ranges of Arizona
Cemeteries in Arizona